Off Centre is an American TV show.

Off Centre or Off Center may also refer to:

Off Centre (album), by Gilbert O'Sullivan, 1980
Off-Centre (EP), by Meat Beat Manifesto, 2005
Off Center (short story collection), by Damon Knight, 1965